Asia's Singing Superstar is a televised Pakistani singing competition. It was hosted by Shweta Pandit and Ahsan Khan, and the winner was Sneha Shankar.

The judges were Shafqat Amanat Ali and Shanker Mahadevan.

Show
The competition took place from late October 2015 to late January 2016. Two contestants were neither Indian 
nor Pakistani: Yasmina Alidodva from Tajikistan, and Ian Cris Tocle from the Philippines.

The contest had no age limit.

Grand finale
The show's grand finale was held on 30 January 2016. Judge Ghulam Ali was absent, and Suresh Wadkar replaced him on the panel. The winner was Sneha Shankar from Shafqat Amanat Ali Team and belongs to India Mumbai.

References

India–Pakistan relations in popular culture
Pakistani music television series
Singing talent shows
Pakistani reality television series